Bowmore distillery  produces Scotch whisky on the Isle of Islay, an island of the Inner Hebrides. The distillery, which lies on the South Eastern shore of Loch Indaal, is one of the oldest in Scotland. It is said to have been established in 1779 and is the oldest running distillery on Islay. The distillery is owned by Morrison Bowmore Distillers Ltd, a holding company owned by Beam Suntory, a subsidiary of Japanese multinational drinks conglomerate Suntory. Morrison Bowmore also own the Auchentoshan and Glen Garioch distilleries and produce the McClelland's Single Malt range of bottlings.

History

The Bowmore Distillery was established in 1779 by a local merchant, John P. Simson, before passing into the ownership of the Mutter family, a family of German descent. James Mutter, head of the family, also had farming interests and was Vice Consul representing the Ottoman Empire, Portugal, and Brazil through their Glasgow consulates. There are no records that pinpoint the date Mutter acquired the distillery from Simpson. Mutter would introduce a number of innovative processes to the distillery during his tenure and even had a small iron steam ship built to import barley and coal from the mainland and to export the whisky to Glasgow. A bottle of 1850 Bowmore Single Malt was sold at an auction in September 2007 for £29,400.

The distillery was closed in 1915 until it was bought from the Mutter family in 1925 by J.B. Sheriff & Co. and remained under their ownership until being purchased by Inverness-based William Grigor & Son, Ltd. in 1950.

During the World Wars the Bowmore Distillery halted production, and hosted the RAF Coastal Command for much of World War II, Coastal Command operated flying boats from Loch Indaal on anti-submarine warfare missions.

Stanley P. Morrison and James Howat formed Stanley P. Morrison Ltd. in 1951, and this company formed Morrison's Bowmore Distillery, Ltd. in 1963 in order to take over the Bowmore Distillery. Stanley P. Morrison died in 1971, and control of the companies passed to Brian Morrison. The company name has changed slightly, and, following minor restructuring, the distillery is now owned by Morrison Bowmore Distillers Ltd., which is ultimately owned by the Japanese distiller Suntory, following their takeover of Morrison Bowmore Distillers Ltd. during 1994. Suntory had previously been a shareholder in Morrison Bowmore for several years.

Production

Bowmore Distillery sources as much barley as possible from on the island of Islay, but there are insufficient quantities produced to satisfy the distillery's demand, so barley is also imported from the mainland. The distillery retains a traditional floor malting, but this also lacks sufficient capacity; the barley imported from the mainland is normally already malted.

The distillery has an annual capacity of two million litres, with fermentation undertaken in traditional wooden washbacks before the liquid is passed through two wash stills and then through two spirit stills.

The waste heat from the distillation process goes to heat a nearby public swimming pool that was built in one of the distillery's former warehouses.

Morrison Bowmore bottles all whisky produced at Bowmore Distillery and their other distilleries at a facility in Springburn, Glasgow.

Products

Standard Range

 Bowmore No. 1
 Bowmore Legend (discontinued)
 Bowmore Small Batch (discontinued)
 Bowmore 12 Year Old
 Bowmore 15 Year Old Darkest
 Bowmore 18 Year Old
 Bowmore 25 Year Old

Limited Edition

 Bowmore 18 Year Manzanilla Cask
 Bowmore 19 Year French Oak Barrique (exclusive to Amazon)
 Bowmore 26 Year French Oak Barrique
 Bowmore 1964
 Bowmore Vault Edition Atlantic Sea Salt
 Bowmore Mizunara Cask
 Bowmore 1957
 Bowmore The 50 Year Old

Travel Retail

 Bowmore 10 Year Old Dark & Intense
 Bowmore 15 Year Old Golden & Elegant
 Bowmore 18 Year Old Deep & Complex
 Bowmore Black Rock (discontinued)
 Bowmore Gold Reef (discontinued)
 Bowmore 17 Year Old White Sands (discontinued)
 Bowmore Springtide (discontinued)
 Bowmore 1984 (500 btls)

Bowmore also produce a number of special edition bottlings and market-specific bottlings. Independent bottlings are also readily available.

See also
 Islay whisky
 Whisky
 Scotch whisky
 List of whisky brands
 List of distilleries in Scotland
 List of historic whisky distilleries

References

External links

 Official Bowmore Website (UK)
 Official Bowmore Website (USA)

Distilleries in Scotland
Whisky distilleries in Islay
1779 establishments in Scotland
Suntory